The Seremban railway station is a Malaysian railway station located in the heart of Seremban, the capital of the state of Negeri Sembilan. The station is named after the city.

The station is served by the KTM ETS train services, as well as the KTM Komuter service introduced in 1995. Since December 2015, the station is served by the Seremban Line which runs between Batu Caves and  stations. The station is also the former southern terminus, and namesake, of the KTM Komuter Seremban line.

The station was once the starting point of the branch line to Port Dickson which served oil train traffic, before being closed in 2008 with the branch line undergoing dismantling in 2022.

History
The station was constructed between 1904 and 1910 at a cost of RM26,000.00, having long served earlier railway companies before the Malayan Railway Administration (now known as the Malayan Railway) took over responsibilities of managing all lines in Malaya in 1948. The station continued to offer Intercity train services along the  Intercity West Coast Line, as well as offering goods deliveries.

From 6 February 1994 to 12 April 1994, the station underwent extensive remodeling in preparation for the launch of the Rawang-to-Seremban stretch of the KTM Komuter commuter train services. The renovation saw the retrofitting of new KTM Komuter facilities into the station, as well as the raising of all platforms in the station to support easier access in and out of KTM locomotives and coaches.

It was the southern terminus of the KTM Komuter's Rawang-Seremban Line since 1995 when the KTM Komuter service began, until the line was extended to Sungai Gadut in 2011. In 2015, the KTM Komuter Southern Service was introduced resulting in Seremban being the terminus again. It was also at this point when the ETS services was extended to Gemas, replacing the Intercity services prior. In 2016, the stretch to Gemas was cut short to Tampin and the shuttle service was merged with the Seremban line, making Tampin the terminus of the line, although some trains will terminate at Sungai Gadut at off-peak times.

Platforms

The station contains three platforms connected by a link bridge. Because the station used to serve as a terminal stop of the KTM Komuter commuter train service, only one line was needed for the service, used as a final stop for its southbound journey and the beginning of its northbound journey (like most EMUs, the KTM Komuter rolling stock is capable of moving backwards or forwards). However, all lines and platforms are currently in use.

The northbound trains stop at platform 1, a side platform directly adjoining the station building. Platforms 2 and 3 are situated on an island platform covered by a metal-framed and wooden shade, and serve southbound Komuter and ETS trains.

Architecture
The station is essentially fashioned in a simplistic form, consisting of an oblong-planned one storey station building containing station offices at the southern half of the station, and ticketing facilities and the passenger concourse in the northern half of the building; a brick-and-plaster entranceway was also included in its earlier iteration. The station features verandahs supported by carved wooden beams sporting curved motives.

The station is covered by two layers of hip roofs: One at the bottom cut at the top by a smaller one with a large gable. A white clock tower is erected atop the roof of the building, topped by an onion dome. The top of the roof is adorned by wooden carvings and small pinnacles on its upper ends.

Location

Around the station
 Tuanku Ja'afar Royal Gallery
 Seremban Lake Gardens
 Seremban Prima Mall
 Seremban Sentral Residences
 Terminal 1
 SMK King George V

References

External links 

Seremban KTM Railway Station

KTM ETS railway stations
Seremban Line
Railway stations in Negeri Sembilan
Rapid transit stations in Negeri Sembilan
Railway stations opened in 1910